The House of Santcliment was an aristocratic and noble Catalan house established by , Lord of Mequinenza, between 1230 and 1244.

History

Lleida branch

In the fourteenth century, members of the Leida branch lived on Carrer Major of Lleida and governed territories that included Alcarràs, Montagut, Sarroca de Lleida, Llardecans, and Vilanova de Remolins. The house also owned large estates in Flix and La Palma d'Ebre, which were sold to Barcelona in 1398. 

Francesc de Santcliment, a notable figure of the Lleida branch of the House of Santcliment, served under Peter IV of Aragon, who sent him as ambassador to Avignon in 1336 and as a defender of the Aran Valley against the bishop of Comminges. Francesc founded the family chapel in the cathedral of Lleida. One of his children, Pere, was chancellor of the University of Lleida (1387-1403), canon, and then bishop of Lleida. His other son Francesc was paer in 1380 and veguer in 1413. The son of Francesc, Bernat de Santcliment, carried out a long lawsuit against the chapter of Lleida due to a dispute over a property near Montagut, which he lost. He also fought in the war against John II of Aragon in 1467 and was paer. By the sixteenth century, this branch was already in decline after losing Alcarrás, Sarroca, and Llardecans.

Barcelona branch

Pere de Santcliment was the first prominent member of the Santcliment branch in Barcelona. He was mentioned by James I of Aragon as "our scribe." The members of this branch continued to serve as notari major of the chancery under Peter III of Aragon. The court positions held by the House helped this Barcelona branch amass fortune. The Santcliments continued to invest in the purchase of lands in addition to their small lordship near the Catalan capital in order to ensure their relevance to the group of distinguished citizens. The Barcelona branch of the Santcliment had a rich heritage and their legacy can be traced in their properties in and around Barcelona. These include the '’ in Sant Andreu de Palomar, consisting of mills and farms; the Torre Vella in Badalona and the casa de la Murtra near Santa Coloma. In addition, the Santcliment were granted land holdings after the conquest of Sardinia, and a member of this house was part of Spain's campaign to control the island.

Prominent members
 Francesc de Santcliment, majordomo of John I of Aragon;
 Pere de Santcliment, bishop of Lleida;
 Guillem de Santcliment, Governor of Minorca;
 Frederic de Santcliment, Governor of Minorca;
 Guillem Ramon de Santcliment, ambassador of the Spanish Crown.

Titles and lordships 
 Grandee
 Marquis of Santa María de Barbará
 Marquis of la Manresana
 Baron of Gelida
 Baron of Cervelló
 Baron of Sant Vicent
 Baron of Llinars
 Baron of Altafulla
 Baron of Balsareny
 Baron of Sarroca
 Baron of Flix
 Lord of Alcarràs
 Lord of Badalona
 Lord of La Granadella
 Lord of La Palma
 Lord of Vilablareix
 Lord of Maldà
 Lord of Cinca
 Lord of Montagut
 Lord of Viladecans

References 
 Some of the information on this page was translated from its Catalán equivalent.

External links 
 Santcliment in GEC (In Catalán)
 Altres famílies i membres l'oligarquia barcelonina pp. 328-338 (In Catalán)

People from Catalonia
13th-century establishments in Spain